Mark Cox was the defending champion, but lost in the second round this year.

Sandy Mayer won the title, defeating Raymond Moore 6–2, 6–4 in the final.

Seeds

  Brian Gottfried (third round)
  Raúl Ramírez (third round)

Draw

Finals

Top half

Section 1

Section 2

Bottom half

Section 3

Section 4

External links
 Main draw

Stockholm Open
1977 Grand Prix (tennis)